Burnt Woods is an unincorporated community in Lincoln County, Oregon, United States.

Burnt Woods post office was established in 1919, after the name was chosen from a list of proposed names sent to the Post Office Department. The signs of past forest fires are still evident in the area. Burnt Woods post office closed in 1978.

The community has a store and a café. The store has been operating since the early 1920s. The café was opened in 1925 and has seen several ownership changes since then.

Ellmaker State Wayside is located about 1 mile (1.6 km) north of Burnt Woods, accessed westbound on U.S. Route 20.

References

External links
Historic images of Burnt Woods from Salem Public Library

Unincorporated communities in Lincoln County, Oregon
1919 establishments in Oregon
Unincorporated communities in Oregon